There are at least 245 named mountains in Lincoln County, Montana.
 Marias Mountain, el. 
 Marmot Mountain, el. 
 Maxine Point, el. 
 McConnell Mountain, el. 
 McDonald Mountain, el. 
 McGuire Mountain, el. 
 McKay Mountain, el. 
 McMillan Mountain, el. 
 Midas Point, el. 
 Middle Mountain, el. 
 Mineral Mountain, el. 
 Mount Baldy, el. 
 Mount Barnaby, el. 
 Mount Conner, el. 
 Mount Gibralter, el. 
 Mount Henry, el. 
 Mount Lewis, el. 
 Mount Locke, el. 
 Mount Marston, el. 
 Mount Obermayer, el. 
 Mount Petery, el. 
 Mount Scotty, el. 
 Mount Snowy, el. 
 Mount Sterling, el. 
 Mount Tom, el. 
 Mount Vernon, el. 
 Mount Wam, el. 
 Murphy Mountain, el. 
 Mushroom Mountain, el. 
 Newton Mountain, el. 
 Norman Mountain, el. 
 Northwest Peak, el. 
 O'Brien Mountain, el. 
 Ojibway Peak, el. 
 Olsen Hill, el. 
 Owl Peak, el. 
 Parmenter Mountain, el. 
 Parsnip Mountain, el. 
 Pheasant Point, el. 
 Pink Mountain, el. 
 Pinkham Mountain, el. 
 Pinto Point, el. 
 Pleasant View Mountain, el. 
 Poker Hill, el. 
 Pony Mountain, el. 
 Poorman Mountain, el. 
 Preacher Mountain, el. 
 Prospect Hill, el. 
 Pulpit Mountain, el. 
 Purcell Summit, el. 
 Quartz Mountain, el. 
 Red Mountain, el. 
 Red Top Mountain, el. 
 Redemption Hill, el. 
 Richards Mountain, el. 
 Riverview Mountain, el. 
 Robinson Mountain (Lincoln County), el. 
 Rock Candy Mountain, el. 
 Roderick Butte, el. 
 Roderick Mountain, el. 
 Rogers Mountain, el. 
 Saddle Mountain, el. 
 Saint Clair Peak, el. 
 Samater Mountain, el. 
 Sand Hill, el. 
 Satire Mountain, el. 
 Savage Mountain, el. 
 Sawtooth Mountain, el. 
 Scalp Mountain, el. 
 Scenery Mountain, el. 
 Shaughnessy Hill, el. 
 Shaw Mountain, el. 
 Sheep Mountain, el. 
 Sheepherder Mountain, el. 
 Sheldon Mountain, el. 
 Sheppard Mountain, el. 
 Silver Butte Mountain, el. 
 Skillet Mountain, el. 
 Skookum Mountain, el. 
 Skyline Mountain, el. 
 Smoky Butte, el. 
 Snell Mountain, el. 
 Snowshoe Peak, el. 
 South Fork Hill, el. 
 Spar Peak, el. 
 Spruce Mountain, el. 
 Stahl Peak, el. 
 Stanley Mountain, el. 
 Stanley Peak, el. 
 Stenerson Mountain, el. 
 Stryker Peak, el. 
 Sugarloaf Mountain, el. 
 Sugarloaf Mountain, el. 
 Surprise Hill, el. 
 Survey Mountain, el. 
 Sutton Mountain, el. 
 Swamp Mountain, el. 
 Swede Mountain, el. 
 Tangen Mountain, el. 
 Taylor Peak, el. 
 Teeters Peak, el. 
 Tenmile Mountain, el. 
 Tepee Mountain, el. 
 Tepee Mountain, el. 
 Thirsty Mountain, el. 
 Thunder Mountain, el. 
 Tony Peak, el. 
 Treasure Mountain, el. 
 Turner Mountain, el. 
 Twin Peaks, el. 
 Vermiculite Mountain, el. 
 Virginia Hill, el. 
 Wapiti Mountain, el. 
 Warland Peak, el. 
 Webb Mountain, el. 
 Weigel Mountain, el. 
 Weir Peak, el. 
 William Grambauer Mountain, el. 
 Wolf Mountain, el. 
 Wolf Point, el. 
 Wood Mountain, el. 
 Yaak Mountain, el. 
 Ziegler Mountain, el. 
 Zimmerman Hill, el.

See also
 List of mountains in Montana
 List of mountain ranges in Montana

Notes

LincolnM-Z